The 1990 East Carolina Pirates football team was an American football team that represented East Carolina University as an independent during the 1990 NCAA Division I-A football season. In their second season under head coach Bill Lewis, the team compiled a 5–6 record.

Schedule

Roster

References

East Carolina
East Carolina Pirates football seasons
East Carolina Pirates football